Maksim Bahdanovič Literary Museum is a museum in Minsk, Belarus. It is dedicated to the writer Maksim Bahdanovič (1891–1917). The work of the bibliographer Nina Vatatsy was central to the museum's foundation.

References

External links
 

Museums in Minsk
Bahdanovic, Maksim
Literary museums in Belarus